Westport station is an Amtrak intercity train station in Westport, New York. It was originally built by the Delaware and Hudson Railroad in 1876, and was expanded twice; the first time being in 1891, and the second time being in 1908. The station houses the Depot Theatre, a professional summer theatre, which was established in 1979. Westport serves the Adirondack as well as Amtrak Thruway buses to Lake Placid, New York.

In 1974, the D&H sold the depot to the town of Westport for $1. Two years later, the Westport Historical Society initiated a major restoration with a particular focus on the lobby. A subsequent renovation began in 1998; the original slate roof was replaced, repairs were made to the ornamental fascia and ADA-compliant bathrooms were installed. The majority of the funding came from an Intermodal Surface Transportation Efficiency Act (ISTEA) grant, with additional money from the New York State Council on the Arts, the Great American Stations Foundation and the theater group.

The station has one low-level side platform on the west side of the track.

References

External links

Westport Amtrak Station (USA Rail Guide -- Train Web)
West Port Depot (Bridge Line Historical Society)

Amtrak stations in New York (state)
Former Delaware and Hudson Railway stations
Amtrak Thruway Motorcoach stations in New York (state)
Transportation buildings and structures in Essex County, New York
Railway stations in the United States opened in 1876